Henry Carwithen McQuillan (30 September 1906 – 28 April 1979) was a Progressive Conservative party member of the House of Commons of Canada. Born in Courtenay, British Columbia, he was a contractor and logger by career.

He made an unsuccessful attempt to defeat CCF incumbent Thomas Speakman Barnett at the Comox—Alberni riding in the 1957 federal election. McQuillan succeeded in the 1958 election, serving in the 24th Parliament before Barnett retook the riding in the 1962 election.

McQuillan also served as a school trustee at one time.

References

External links
 

1906 births
1979 deaths
Members of the House of Commons of Canada from British Columbia
Progressive Conservative Party of Canada MPs
People from Courtenay, British Columbia